Moskovskiy or Moskva (Maskav) is a location in Tajikistan. The population of the town is 23,300 (January 2020 estimate). 

Internet sources often identify Moskovskiy with Chubek, but in fact this is another village in the district, located about 5 km south-east from Moskva.

References

Populated places in Khatlon Region